Arne Marit (born 21 January 1999) is a Belgian racing cyclist, who currently rides for UCI WorldTeam .

Major results

2016
 9th Ronde van Vlaanderen Juniores
2017
 1st Nokere Koerse Juniores
 1st Stage 2b Niedersachsen-Rundfahrt der Junioren
 4th E3 Harelbeke Junioren
 5th Ronde van Vlaanderen Juniores
2018
 1st Stage 1 (TTT) Okolo Jižních Čech
 8th Circuit de Wallonie
2019
 1st Grand Prix Criquielion
 3rd Antwerpse Havenpijl
 8th Overall Le Triptyque des Monts et Châteaux
 8th De Kustpijl
 8th Memorial Philippe Van Coningsloo
2020
 1st Stage 1 Tour Bitwa Warszawska 1920
 2nd Road race, National Under-23 Road Championships
 7th Dorpenomloop Rucphen
 8th Paris–Tours Espoirs
2021
 1st Grand Prix du Morbihan
 4th Gooikse Pijl
 5th Grote Prijs Jef Scherens
 5th Ronde van Drenthe
 7th Paris–Tours
 9th Grote Prijs Jean-Pierre Monseré
2022
 8th Schaal Sels
 9th Gooikse Pijl
 10th Memorial Rik Van Steenbergen

References

External links

1999 births
Living people
Belgian male cyclists
Sportspeople from Sint-Niklaas
Cyclists from East Flanders
21st-century Belgian people